Sociedad Deportiva Leioa is a Spanish football team based in Leioa, in the autonomous community of Basque Country. Founded in 1925 it plays in Tercera División RFEF – Group 4, holding home games at Estadio Sarriena, which has a capacity of 3,741 spectators.

History 
In the 2017–18 season, the club finished 10th in the Segunda División B, Group 2.

Season to season

7 season in Segunda División B
6 seasons in Tercera División
1 season in Tercera División RFEF

Current squad

Honours
Tercera División: 2013–14

Former players
 Chupe
 Gorka Luariz

References

External links
Official website 
Futbolme team profile 
Estadios de España 

Football clubs in the Basque Country (autonomous community)
Association football clubs established in 1925
1925 establishments in Spain
Sport in Biscay